Sierra Tonante (Italian for "Thundering Mountain Range") was a wooden roller coaster at Mirabilandia, Savio in Emilia-Romagna, Italy that operated between 1992 and 2007. It was designed by William Cobb & Werner Stengel and opened as Europe's tallest and fastest wooden roller coaster with the longest ride time.

Closure

The ride was shut down in 2007 and demolished in 2008. A new Italian government regulation was introduced in 2007 which requires stricter building specification on amusement park rides, including roller coasters. Mirabilandia's administration, after careful consultation with their engineers came to the conclusion that modifying the ride to meet these new regulation guidelines was too costly and that replacing it with a new ride would cost the same and have a greater financial return to the park. Sierra Tonante was replaced by iSpeed: A launched steel roller coaster manufactured by Intamin AG.

References

External links
 http://www.mirabilandia.it/attrazioni_sierra_en.htm

Roller coasters in Italy